The Crown Lands Act 1623 (21 Jac 1 c 25) is an Act of the Parliament of England.

This Act was partly in force in Great Britain at the end of 2010.

See also
Crown Lands Act

References
Halsbury's Statutes,

External links
The Crown Lands Act 1623, as amended, from Legislation.gov.uk.

Acts of the Parliament of England
1623 in law
1623 in England